The Caribbean Cultural Center African Diaspora Institute (CCCADI) is a nonprofit organization based in East Harlem in New York City that serves as an Afro-Caribbean center  of culture and community for members of the African diaspora.

History 
CCCADI was founded in 1976 by Dr. Marta Moreno Vega. She was the director of CCCADI from 1976 to 2018.

In January 2018, Vega became an advisor to the Board of Directors, with Margarita Rosa, Esq. taking on the role of interim director of CCCADI while a search for a new executive director is taking place.

Facilities 

CCCADI is currently located in a decommissioned historic landmark fire house on 125th Street near Park Avenue in East Harlem in New York City, after the City decided to decommission five firehouses and turn them into cultural centers. The building was sold to CCCADI for $1. The cost of the renovation was $9.3 million, and the project took six years to complete. The center opened in October 2016.  The building is listed on the National Register of Historic Places as Fire Hook and Ladder Company No. 14.

Previously, the Center was in the Hell's Kitchen neighborhood of Manhattan on West 58th Street.

Exhibitions 
In addition to art exhibits, the center also schedules regular lectures and concerts related to the Caribbean and African cultures.

Exhibits include the following:
 2013: Saving our Soul: From the Big Easy to the Big Apple
 2016: Home, Memory, and Future
 2018: Defend Puerto Rico

Publications

References

External links 
 CCADI
 

Afro-Caribbean
East Harlem
Non-profit organizations based in New York City
Organizations established in 1976
1976 establishments in New York City